Seven Tears is an album by Dutch rock band Golden Earring, released in 1971. The album was not issued in the U.S.

Track listing
All songs written by Kooymans except where noted.

"Silver Ships" - 5:40
"The Road Swallowed Her Name" - 4:07
"Hope" (Gerritsen, Hay) - 4:46
"Don't Worry" (Hay) - 3:20
"She Flies on Strange Wings" - 7:22
"This Is the Other Side of Life" - 3:19
"You're Better Off Free" - 6:44

Personnel
George Kooymans - guitar, vocals
Rinus Gerritsen - bass guitar, keyboards
Barry Hay - flute, vocals, guitar
Cesar Zuiderwijk - drums

Production
Producer: Fred Haayen

Charts

Golden Earring albums
1971 albums
Polydor Records albums